Half A Cow is an independent record label from Australia, established in 1990 by Sydney musician and music identity Nic Dalton.

History 
In 1987 - 1989 Dalton ran a bookshop (owned by Dalton's parents) in the Sydney suburb of Glebe called Dalton's Books.  In late 1989, Dalton and his friend Miles Ferguson, took over the store, renamed it Half A Cow and started stocking more comics, records and tee-shirts than the 'beat' books they had been concentrating on. At the same time, they started Half A Cow Records and started working on the label's first release, Billiepeebup (hac01, released October 1990) - a 4-track recorded album of songs made between 1985 and 1989 by the Love Positions, a duo of Dalton and his then girlfriend, Robyn St Clare from The Hummingbirds. That wPleasure (cow01) by the [1990.

In 1991, Half A Cow released the single Don't Want To Be Grant McLennan by Smudge (about Go-Betweens co-founder Grant McLennan), which was an indie hit, and single of the week in music magazine NME

In late 1991 Evan Dando asked Dalton to temporarily join The Lemonheads. An offer he initially turned down, but as Dando pointed out that it'd make his label known worldwide, and with persuasion from friends he did indeed join, and as expected in 1992 it gave a huge boost for Half a Cow. Before he left Half A Cow assistant, Dave Chatfield, was appointed to run the label, along with Robyn St Clare.  In 1992 the label also signed a deal with Festival Records to distribute the label. In 1994 the label switched distributor to Mercury Records, which was followed by a change in 1998 back to Festival Records. In early 2000 Half A Cow ended its relationship with Festival Records and now the label is completely independent and distributed through MGM Distribution. Chatfield moved to Melbourne to pursue touring with Spunk and the label is solely managed by Dalton.

Since its establishment in 1990 Half A Cow has put out over two hundred and fifty releases by a long line of bands and solo acts, including work by Dalton and bands he has been in (such as Sneeze,  Godstar, a re-issue of The Plunderers' Banana Smoothie, Honey, and Nic Dalton and his Gloomchasers), who dissolved in November 2019. As of May 2006, the label is based back in Sydney (after six years in NSW's central west and a year in Digger's Rest, Victoria) where it continues to release contemporary Australian music as well as a series of re-issues by bands from the 1960s (like  Pip Proud, The Missing Links, The Purple Hearts and the Wild Cherries). The label took a break from releasing any new recordings between 2012 and 2014 but returned in 2015 with a new album from Bernie Hayes. 2016 saw the reissue of two mid 2000s albums by Perth band The Burton Cool Suit and more recently the label has released new music featuring Dalton's collaboration with Adem K from Turnstyle.

Documentary
Melbourne filmmaker Jarrad Kennedy is completing a documentary about Nic Dalton, covering his work as a musician and label boss for Half A Cow.

If It's Catchy will be released in 2016 with Part II to follow in 2018.

Past and present roster 
 2 Litre Dolby
 Agnes Kain
 Art of Fighting
 Bernie Hayes
 Blooming Heck
 Booster Valves
 Bruce
 The Brutals
 The Burton Cool Suit
 The City Views
 Captain Denim
 Carton
 Chewee
 Crow
 The Daisygrinders
 Craven Fops
 Dog Trumpet
 Deezleteens
 Jon Duncan 
 The Eastern Dark
 The Exbats
 Fragile (band)|Fragile
 Fuzzy
 Grandview (band)|Grandview
 Glovebox
 Godstar
 The Hotpoints
 Hippy Dribble
 I do You do Karate
 John Dowler's Vanity Project
 Khancoban
 Key Out
 Kid Cornered
 Kim Salmon and the Business
 Kim Salmon and the Surrealists
 The Likes Of You
 Love Parade
 Love Positions
 Luke Russell
 Machine translations
 The Missing Links
 Modern Bombers
 The Nagging Doubts
 Nic Dalton
 Nic Dalton and his Gloomchasers
 The Orange Humble Band
 Papas Fritas
 Pip Proud
 The Plunderers
 Pressed Meat & the Smallgoods
 The Proposition
 The Purple Hearts (band)|the Purple Hearts
 Python Lee Jackson (band)|Python Lee Jackson
 The Ramalamas
 the Raylenes
 Ruby for Lucy
 Rural France
 The Savages
 She Loves You Too
 Sidewinder
 The Smallgoods
 Smudge
 Sneeze
 Spdfgh
 The Sticker Club
 Swirl
 Swayback
 Tendrils
 The Triangles
 The Trouble Dolls
 Vermishus
 Warmer (band)|Warmer
 We Grow Up
 The Wednesday Night
 Whopping Big Naughty
 The Wild Cherries
 Wilding (singer-songwriter)|Wilding
 You & Your So-Called Friends

See also 
 List of record labels

References 
Stranded: The Secret History of Australian Independent Music 1977-1991, Clinton Walker, Pan MacMillan, 1996, .
Interview with Nic Dalton by Roo Simpson, June 2005, at evandando.co.uk

External links 
 Official site

Australian independent record labels
Record labels established in 1990
Indie rock record labels
1990 establishments in Australia